Jump-off Joe was a 100-foot-tall sea stack geological formation composed of middle Miocene concretionary sandstone at Nye Beach in Newport, Oregon, United States. It was a well-known tourist attraction before World War I. It formed sometime before the 1880s when it was connected to the mainland, and was a major impediment walking the beach. Early travelers would have to jump off the side to get over it, hence the name. Early writers claimed the site was connected with Native American mythology. Natural forces separated it from the mainland in the 1890s, and its large arch collapsed in 1916.

Etymology
The name "Jump-Off Joe" originated from the son of Dr. John McLoughlin, Joseph. Joseph accidentally fell near the rock during a trapping expedition but managed to survive for nine more years before dying of his injuries. The rock was originally known as "The Jump-Off Where Joe Fell", before being shortened to "Jump-Off Joe".

Key Events

 Between 1920 and 1970, the majority of the sea stack collapsed, and by 1990 it had been swept away, and little trace remains today.

 In 1970 and 1990, members of the United States Geological Survey photographed the remains of the sea-stack.

In late January of 2021, Jump-Off Joe was affected by a landslide and closed it off to the public due to safety risks.

References

External links
Historic images of Jump Off Joe from Salem Public Library

Natural arches of Oregon
Newport, Oregon
Landforms of Lincoln County, Oregon
Stacks of the United States
Rock formations of Oregon
West Coast of the United States
Collapsed arches